John Michael Hammond (born 9 April 1966) is a meteorologist and an English weather forecaster for the BBC. For a long time he could be seen presenting weather forecasts on the BBC News channel, BBC Red Button and BBC World News. He was the main weather presenter on BBC News at One and on the BBC News at Ten, Countryfile and BBC News at Six. At the weekend he also presents the weather on BBC Radio 5 Live. He is currently presenting for the BBC in Birmingham, including the regional news programme Midlands Today.

Early life and education
Hammond was born in Bosham, West Sussex, the son of a farmer. After taking an interest in the weather from the age of four, he studied geography at the University of Salford, followed by meteorology at the University of Birmingham.

Career
After a brief spell at the Met Office headquarters in Bracknell, Berkshire, Hammond started forecasting in February 1991, working at regional weather centres in Nottingham, Bristol and Plymouth. This involved a variety of forecasting work for aviation, local industry, and some local radio too. He spent around seven years presenting the weather at ITV until joining the BBC Weather Centre in the spring of 2003.

He also appeared on the BBC quiz show Celebrity Mastermind in 2012.

He left the BBC at the end of March 2017 and now runs Weather Trending with Sara Thornton

Hammond is a massive fan of English rock band Status Quo and he went on stage with the band playing with his guitar and went on the Ark Royal to watch the band play live on stage to promote their album Heavy Traffic.

Hammond joined BBC Radio 4 in March 2019 as a continuity announcer.

References

External links

 

1966 births
Living people
People from Bosham
Civil servants in the Department for Business, Innovation and Skills
English civil servants
English meteorologists
English radio presenters
BBC weather forecasters
BBC Radio 5 Live presenters
Alumni of the University of Birmingham
Alumni of the University of Salford
ITV people
ITV Weather